Un Lugar al sol is a 1965 Argentine film.

Cast
 María Cristina Laurenz
 Héctor Pellegrini
 Lola Palombo
 Jorge Villalba
 Orlando Bor

External links
 

1965 films
1960s Spanish-language films
Argentine black-and-white films
1960s Argentine films